NGC 392 is a lenticular galaxy located in the constellation Pisces. It was discovered on September 12, 1784 by William Herschel. It was described by Dreyer as "faint, very small, round, much brighter middle, between 2 stars."

References

External links
 

0392
04042
00700
+05-03-062
17840912
Pisces (constellation)
Discoveries by William Herschel
Lenticular galaxies